Darbhanga Division is an administrative geographical unit of Bihar state of India, and Darbhanga city is the administrative headquarters of the division. , the division consists of Darbhanga district, Madhubani district, and Samastipur district.

See also

Divisions of Bihar
Districts of Bihar

References

 
Divisions of Bihar
Populated places in Mithila, India